The Foreign Intelligence Agency ( (or ) is a Polish intelligence agency tasked with the gathering of public and secret information abroad for the Republic of Poland.

Current Head of the Foreign Intelligence Agency is Colonel Bartosz Jarmuszkiewicz.

Genesis 
When the People's Republic of Poland ended in 1989, the new authorities faced the challenge of reforming the special services, which were viewed very negatively by most Poles.

In April 1990, a law was passed creating the Office of State Protection (UOP), which replaced the Departments I and II of the Ministry of Internal Affairs. This marked the abolition of the Security Service (SB). The UOP was a separate, neutral institution that was not part of the Ministry of the Interior, indicating the depoliticization of the intelligence services. The Office of State Protection was supervised by the Ministry of the Interior in terms of personnel policy, the general policy of the head of the UOP and its compliance with state policy. Even then, however, there was a realization that intelligence should rather be under the authority of foreign affairs. The reason why the separation of intelligence and counterintelligence had not yet been decided upon in 1990 was the costliness of such an undertaking.

Even before the 2002 Law came into effect and two separate agencies were established, the position of Head of the UOP had already become the subject of a constitutional dispute. Indeed, this function was entrusted to Zbigniew Siemiątkowski, who was both an MP and secretary of state. The dispute concerned the issue of combining the MP's mandate with other government employment. According to Article 103(1) of the Polish Constitution, this is prohibited. On the other hand, however, in the same place in the Polish Constitution, an exception to this rule appears, stating that members of the Council of Ministers and secretaries of state in government administration may sit in parliament. The Constitutional Court spoke on the matter, ruling in 2004 (after the 2002 reform) that giving the heads of the ABW and AW the rank of secretaries of state is unconstitutional, as it circumvents the prohibition on combining a parliamentary mandate with employment in government administration. According to the CT ruling, the only legal effect of conferring the rank of secretary of state is the possibility of combining the position of agency head with a parliamentary mandate.

Roles
The Foreign Intelligence Agency usually operates out of the territory of the Republic of Poland. Its activity within the territory of the Republic of Poland may be conducted only within a limited scope, exclusively in connection with its activity out of the state's frontiers. The roles of the Foreign Intelligence Agency include:

 Obtaining, analyzing, processing and forwarding information that may be significant to the security and international position of the Republic of Poland, as well as to its economic potential;
 Recognizing and counteracting external threats to the security, defense, independence and inviolability of the Republic of Poland;
 Protecting foreign diplomatic missions of the Republic of Poland and their officials from the activities of foreign intelligence services and other activities negatively that may affect the interests of the Republic of Poland;
 Ensuring protection of cryptographic communication with the Polish diplomatic missions and consulates, and of diplomatic pouch;
 Recognizing international terrorism, extremism and international organized crime groups;
 Recognizing international trade in weapons, ammunition and explosive materials, narcotics, psychotropic substances, as well as in goods, technologies and services of strategic importance to the state's security, recognizing international trade in weapons of mass destruction and threats related to the proliferation of those weapons and their carriers;
 Recognizing and analyzing threats occurring in the regions of tensions, conflicts and international crises that exert influence on the state's security, as well as actions undertaking aimed at eliminating those threats;
 Conducting signals intelligence;

Structure
The Foreign Intelligence Agency comprises the following organizational units:
Bureau I
Bureau II
Bureau III
Bureau IV
Bureau V
Bureau VI
Bureau VII
Bureau VIII
Staff Training Centre
Independent Legal Unit

However, the Head of the Foreign Intelligence Agency is authorized to form or appoint units of a permanent or ad hoc character (e.g. task units).

Current management
Head of the Foreign Intelligence Agency: Colonel Bartosz Jarmuszkiewicz
Deputy Head of the Foreign Intelligence Agency: Colonel Dominik Duda
Deputy Head of the Foreign Intelligence Agency: Colonel Anetta Maciejewska

List of heads

See also
 History of Polish intelligence services

References

External links

Polish intelligence agencies